Zaharija is a Serbian name, a variant of the Biblical name Zachary, through Greek Zacharias.

Variant transliterations into the Latin alphabet include Zaharia and Zaharije.

Notable people with this name
Zaharija Dečanac, Metropolitan of Raška and Prizren (1819–1830)
Koja Zaharia (d. before 1442) and his son Lekë Zaharia (d. 1444), Albanian noblemen, members of the Zaharia family
Zaharija of Serbia (890s–924), medieval Prince
Zaharije Orfelin (1726–1785), Serb polymath 
Zaharija Trnavčević, leader of current Serbian political party Rich Serbia

See also
Zaharia

Serbian masculine given names